Mount de Sales Academy is an all-girls secondary school located in Catonsville in unincorporated Baltimore County, Maryland. The school is located near the city of Baltimore and within the Roman Catholic Archdiocese of Baltimore.

The school is affiliated with the Roman Catholic Church and is partially staffed by the Dominican Sisters of St. Cecilia.

Mount de Sales Academy was founded in 1852 by the Visitation Sisters as a boarding school for girls and boys. Now teaching only girls it now serves as a college-preparatory school. It was the first institution in Baltimore County to offer education to women of all religious denominations.

Reputation
Mount de Sales Academy was named one of the top 50 Catholic schools in the country by the Catholic High School Honor Roll since 2004 on the basis of academics, Catholic identity, and civic education . It is the only school in the state of Maryland to be included in the list.

Campus and Buildings
The back yard of the school is home to a garden featuring a statue of the Blessed Virgin Mary. The campus also includes athletic fields, a convent, and a gymnasium.

Most classes are still held in the original school building, begun in 1852 and expanded in the 1860s. The main building, which is listed on the National Register of Historic Places, retains architectural traces of the cloistered sisters of the Visitation Order who founded the school. The chapel, located in the center of the main building, is the oldest place of worship still in use in Baltimore. The stained glass windows in the chapel, original to the building, were cast in the same place and manufacturing technique as the famous stained glass of the Cathedral of Chartres, France. The windows are located at the back of the building, as Catholics in the area were undergoing much persecution at the time of the building's planning, and its founders wished to avoid vandalism and protest. The building also includes the Music Hall, which has details such as trompe-l'œil painting, the Padre Pio library, which contains relics of that saint and a mosaic in his honor, computer labs, a spacious art studio, and the Ramona Carrigan Science Center.

The recently renovated Regina Keenan Knott Alumnae Hall was formerly an infirmary for the school's boarding students. At one time it was connected to the main building by a walkway which has since been demolished. the building's front is the opposite of the main building so that visitors would not see any of the sick or otherwise ailing girls.

The Constance and Samuel Pistorio Sports Complex was dedicated in 1999. Its design was modeled after the architecture of the campus' historic buildings. The facility is located across from the main building, on a piazza featuring gardens and a bronze statue of Saint Joseph the Worker.

The Board of Trustees launched a three phase capital campaign in June 2010. The campaign is entitled, Anchored in Excellence; Charting our Future. The phases are highlighted below:

Phase I
A. New Convent
Estimated $2 million ($1.5 million construction and $500,000 maintenance endowment)
B. Security Fencing, Lighting, and Surveillance Cameras
Estimated $1 million
C. Heating, Ventilation, and Air Conditioning (HVAC) System for 1852 Building
Estimated $1 million

Phase II
Regulation Turf Athletic Field with built-in Hillside Stadium Seating
Estimated $1.5 million

Phase III
Performing Arts Building
Estimated $9 million

Brother School
The nearby all-boys Mount Saint Joseph High School is the Brother School  of Mount de Sales Academy. The two schools share their long history with each other. In the present day:
 The schools jointly produce theatrical events
 The schools cooperate on bus service
 Sailor cheerleaders support Gaels' sporting events
 The schools hold joint social events such as dances
 The schools share many school clubs

Notable alumnae
Nicolette Jennings, Miss Florida USA 2019
Brigid Kemmerer, young adult author

Gallery

See also

National Catholic Educational Association

References and notes

External links

 
 Roman Catholic Archdiocese of Baltimore

Catonsville, Maryland
Catholic secondary schools in Maryland
School buildings on the National Register of Historic Places in Maryland
Italianate architecture in Maryland
Neoclassical architecture in Maryland
Private schools in Baltimore County, Maryland
Girls' schools in Maryland
Educational institutions established in 1852
1852 establishments in Maryland
Catholic schools in Maryland
Dominican schools in the United States
National Register of Historic Places in Baltimore County, Maryland